Gayatri Gyan Mandir is a Hindu temple located at Washery Colony, near Mahuda Junction railway station, Mahuda, Dhanbad, Jharkhand, India. Here the goddess Gayatri is worshipped. It is a temple located in Baghmara census town in Dhanbad. The temple campus is located near Mahuda Bazaar. Mahadeo Mandir is also nearest to it.

References
 Sanyog's Research

Hindu temples in Jharkhand
Dhanbad district
Religious buildings and structures completed in 2004
Durga temples